Fassifern is a rural locality in the Scenic Rim Region, Queensland, Australia.

History 
The name Fassifern comes from a pastoral run name, used in 1846 by pastoralists John Cameron and Macquarie McDonald, possibly named for a place in Scotland called Fassifern.

Fassifern Provisional School opened circa 1879 and closed circa 1887.

Geography
Reynolds Creek forms the eastern boundary, while Warrill Creek forms most of the western. Washpool Gully flows through from south-west to north-west, where it joins Warrill Creek.

The Cunningham Highway runs through from north-west to south-west, and Boonah-Fassifern Road (State Route 90) runs east from the highway, forming most of the southern boundary.

History 
The locality contained 12 households, in which 68.4% of the population were males and 31.6% of the population were females with a median age of 50, 12 years above the national average. The average weekly household income was $575, $863 below the national average.

Education 
There are no schools in Fassifern. The nearest government primary schools are Kalbar State School in neighbouring Kalbar to the north-east and Aratula State School in neighbouring Aratula to the south-west. The nearest government secondary school is Boonah State High School in Boonah to the south-east.

References

Further reading 

 

Scenic Rim Region
Localities in Queensland